Voyagers! is an American science fiction television series about time travel that aired on NBC from October 3, 1982, to July 10, 1983, during the 1982–1983 season. The series starred Jon-Erik Hexum and Meeno Peluce.

Opening narration

Plot
Phineas Bogg (Jon-Erik Hexum) was one of a society of time travelers called Voyagers who, with the help of a young boy named Jeffrey Jones (played by Meeno Peluce) from 1982, used a hand-held device called an Omni (which looked much like a large pocket watch that flashes red when history is wrong and green when the timeline is corrected) to travel in time and ensured that history unfolded as we know it.

Bogg and Jeffrey first met when Bogg's Omni malfunctioned and took him to 1982 (the device was not supposed to reach any later than 1970), landing him in the skyscraper apartment of Jeffrey's aunt and uncle, who were caring for him after his parents' deaths. Bogg's Guidebook, which contained a detailed description of how history was supposed to unfold, was grabbed by Jeffrey's dog Ralph, and in the struggle to retrieve it Jeffrey accidentally fell out his bedroom window and Bogg jumped out to rescue him by activating the Omni. With his Guidebook stuck in 1982, Bogg (who, being more interested in girls than in history, apparently never paid much attention in his Voyager training/history classes) had to rely on Jeffrey, whose father had been a history professor, to help him. Jeffrey's knowledge proved invaluable; for example, in the first episode, Jeffrey ensured that baby Moses' basket traveled down the Nile where it was met by the Pharaoh's daughter.

Phineas was a great womanizer and managed to fall for a beautiful woman in almost every episode. Whenever Jeffrey's wisdom was paired up against Bogg's stubbornness, Jeffrey usually won out, to which Bogg would always mutter, "Smart kids give me a pain!" Another catchphrase used by Bogg as an expletive was "Bat's breath!"  They developed a strong relationship and became a formidable team. In the course of their adventures together, they sometimes encountered other Voyagers whose missions happened to overlap with theirs.

It was revealed later in the series that despite Jeffrey's age, and the accidental circumstances of his first encounter with Phineas, he was always destined to become a Voyager.

Over the closing credits of each episode, regular cast member Meeno Peluce said in voice-over: "If you want to learn more about [historical element from the episode], take a voyage down to your public library. It's all in books!"

Cast
 Jon-Erik Hexum as Phineas Bogg
 Meeno Peluce as Jeffrey Jones

Reception
Tom Shales of The Washington Post praised the series as "a live-action version of the Mr. Peabody and Sherman cartoons on the delightful old 'Bullwinkle' show" and "largely a joy ride from start to finish."

Voyagers! ran for one season of 20 episodes, broadcast opposite the top-rated 60 Minutes. The series averaged a 17 share. Voyagers! seemed likely to be renewed for a second season, but controversies in 60 Minutes reporting led executives to believe that 60 Minutes might successfully be challenged by a competing news program instead. NBC canceled Voyagers! and replaced it with the news magazine program Monitor, which averaged only a 7 share. David Letterman poked fun at NBC's cancellation of the series by airing a sketch on his Late Night program titled "They Took My Show Away", a parody of the after school special in which the host comforts a boy who was a Voyagers! fan.

US television ratings
<onlyinclude>

Home media

Television film

In 1985, following the death of series lead Jon-Erik Hexum, Universal re-edited several episodes of the show into a television film. Entitled Voyager from the Unknown, the story combined  the pilot episode and "Voyagers of the Titanic" into one feature-length film. This version incorporates new video special effects, some voice-over dubbing for Hexum and Peluce's characters that changed, and added dialogue and new footage to include a super-computer directing Voyager missions.

The opening begins with a narration and painted illustrations of Bogg receiving his Guidebook on "Planet Voyager" by artist Jerry Gebr.

"Far out in the cosmos there exists a planet known as Voyager, where the mystery of travel into space and through time has been solved. It is inhabited by a race who call themselves Voyagers. Their purpose is to keep constant surveillance on history. These people have a time machine device, the Omni, which will take them into the past, present or future. As each Voyager graduates he is given an omni and a guidebook. One such graduate Phineas Bogg, who was assigned as a field worker to operate in certain time zones."

VHS release
The re-edited telefilm was issued on VHS by MCA Home Video in 1985. It would be the only official release of Voyagers! on home video in the US until the DVD release in 2007.

DVD release
On July 17, 2007, Universal Studios Home Entertainment released all 20 episodes of Voyagers! on DVD in Region 1. It was released in Region 2 on October 29, 2007.

Streaming
All 20 episodes are also available in the United States by streaming through Amazon Prime Video.

Episodes

References

Bibliography

External links
 Voyagers Guidebook
 
 Voyagers Guidebook (Blog Site)

1982 American television series debuts
1983 American television series endings
1980s American science fiction television series
Alternate history television series
English-language television shows
NBC original programming
Television series by Universal Television
American time travel television series
1980s American time travel television series
Cultural depictions of Mark Twain
Cultural depictions of Theodore Roosevelt
Cultural depictions of Franklin D. Roosevelt
Cultural depictions of T. E. Lawrence
Cultural depictions of Spartacus
Cultural depictions of Billy the Kid
Cultural depictions of Jack the Ripper
Cultural depictions of the Wright brothers
Cultural depictions of Babe Ruth
Cultural depictions of Charles Dickens
Cultural depictions of Isaac Newton
Cultural depictions of Harry Houdini
Cultural depictions of Marco Polo
Cultural depictions of Kublai Khan
Cultural depictions of Albert Schweitzer
Cultural depictions of Alexander Graham Bell
Cultural depictions of Arthur Conan Doyle
Cultural depictions of Louis Pasteur
Cultural depictions of Buffalo Bill
Cultural depictions of Jimmy Carter
Cultural depictions of Thomas Edison
Cultural depictions of George Washington
Depictions of Abraham Lincoln on television
Cultural depictions of Albert Einstein
Cultural depictions of Andrew Jackson
Depictions of Cleopatra on television
Cultural depictions of Queen Victoria on television
Television series about RMS Titanic